Irena Kočí (born 17 September 1955) is a Czech politician and former member of the Chamber of Deputies for Czech Social Democratic Party. She replaced Michal Pohanka, former member of the Chamber for ČSSD, who left the Social Democratic caucus and used to vote with the government parties.

She took her matura exam at the secondary in Moravský Krumlov and continued at an economic secondary school in Brno.

Kočí joined Czech Social Democratic Party in 1998. In 2008, she was elected to the Council of the South Moravian Region.

External links 
 Biography

1955 births
Living people
Members of the Chamber of Deputies of the Czech Republic (2006–2010)
Czech Social Democratic Party MPs
20th-century Czech women politicians
21st-century Czech women politicians